The 2004–05 season of the División de Honor de Futsal is the 16th season of top-tier futsal in Spain.

Regular season

League table

Playoffs

Championship playoffs

The Finals were broadcast in Spain on TVE2 and Teledeporte.

Relegation playoff

 PSG Móstoles remained in División de Honor.

External links
2004–05 season at lnfs.es

See also
División de Honor de Futsal
Futsal in Spain

Spain
futsal
Liga Nacional de Fútbol Sala seasons